William Campbell (born 1745 and died on August 22, 1781) was a Virginia farmer, pioneer, and soldier. One of the thirteen signers of the earliest statement of armed resistance to the British Crown in the Thirteen Colonies, the Fincastle Resolutions,  Campbell represented Hanover County in the Virginia House of Delegates. A militia leader during the American Revolutionary War, he was known to Loyalists as the "bloody tyrant of Washington County", but to the Patriots he was known for his leadership at the Battle of Kings Mountain and the Battle of Guilford Courthouse.

Civic and military leader
In 1775, Campbell was one of the thirteen signers of the Fincastle Resolutions, the earliest statement of armed resistance to the British Crown in the Thirteen Colonies. Campbell represented Hanover County, Virginia in the Virginia House of Delegates twice: in 1780, and again in 1781 (the year that he died).

He was a militia leader of the American Revolutionary War, known for harsh treatment of Loyalists.  It was alleged he had executed at least one loyalist, thus leading to their label of him as the "bloody tyrant of Washington County".  He became a colonel in 1780, and was noted for leading his militia to victory at the Battle of Kings Mountain, where he charged the enemy while telling his men to "shout like hell and fight like devils!" Afterward, he worked in conjunction with Continental Army troops to oppose the British invasion of Virginia, providing support at the Battle of Guilford Courthouse.  The Virginia Assembly commissioned him a brigadier general in 1781, however, he died soon after.

Personal life 
Campbell was married to Elizabeth Henry, sister of Virginia Governor, Patrick Henry.  They had two children: Sarah Buchanan Campbell, and Charles Henry Campbell.  Following Campbell's 1781 death of an apparent heart attack, his widow subsequently married General William Russell.

Salt Lick 
The tract of land where the Campbells settled was called "Salt Lick" for the area's numerous salt deposits. The salt works that were eventually established there became an important source of revenue for the family, also playing an important role in supplying salt for the Confederacy during the Civil War. It had been surveyed in 1748, when James Patton entered the area with an expedition of several men, including one Charles Campbell. After William Campbell's death, the General Assembly of Virginia granted 5,000 acres to his young son, Charles Henry Campbell, in consideration of the distinguished services of his father.

Burial and legacy
William Campbell is buried in the Aspenvale Cemetery (near present-day Marion, Smyth County, Virginia), alongside Elizabeth Campbell "Madam" Russell.  The cemetery is a Virginia historical landmark, with soldiers from six different wars interred there.

Campbell County, Virginia, is named for General Campbell, as is one of the counties high schools, William Campbell Middle and High School.

In her later years, Elizabeth founded the Madam Russell Methodist Church.

Notes

References 
Ward, Harry M. "Campbell, William". American National Biography Online, February 2000.
 History of Southwest Virginia, 1746-1786: Washington County, 1777-1870 by Lewis Preston Summers, 1903, pages 584-587
Smyth County, Virginia - History tour guide

1745 births
1781 deaths
Members of the Virginia House of Delegates
Signers of the Fincastle Resolutions
Militia generals in the American Revolution
Virginia militiamen in the American Revolution
18th-century American politicians